The Chinnasalem block is a revenue block in the Kallakurichi district of Tamil Nadu, India. It has a total of 50 panchayat villages.

List of Panchayat Villages

References 
 
 

Revenue blocks of Kallakurichi district